Events from the year 1662 in Ireland.

Incumbent
Monarch: Charles II

Events
February 21 – James Butler, 1st Duke of Ormonde, returns to the office of Lord Lieutenant of Ireland (until 1669).
September – regular Donaghadee to Portpatrick short sea sailings are established.
Act of Settlement, passed by the Parliament of Ireland, orders that settlers under the Cromwellian Act of Settlement 1652 should give up a portion of their allotted land to "Old English" and "innocent Catholics". The first Court of Claims sits from 20 September 1662 to 21 August 1663.

Arts and literature
John Ogilby, Master of the Revels in Ireland, opens the first Theatre Royal, Dublin, in Smock Alley.

Births
April 9 – William Conolly, politician (d.1729)
William O'Brien, 3rd Earl of Inchiquin, nobleman (d.1719)

Deaths
June 30 – Daniel O'Daly, diplomat and historian (b.1595)

References

 
1660s in Ireland
Ireland
Years of the 17th century in Ireland